Spatuloricaria euacanthagenys, sometimes known as the longtail pleco, is a species of catfish in the family Loricariidae. It is native to South America, where it occurs in the Japurá River basin in Colombia. The species reaches 52 cm (20.5 inches) in length.

References 

Loricariini
Fish described in 1979
Catfish of South America
Fish of Colombia